Joaquín Solano (June 2, 1913 – February 15, 2003) was a Mexican Olympic medalist in equestrianism. He was born in Chicontepec de Tejeda, Veracruz.

References
Joaquín Solano's profile at Sports Reference.com

1913 births
2003 deaths
Olympic bronze medalists for Mexico
Equestrians at the 1948 Summer Olympics
Olympic equestrians of Mexico
Mexican male equestrians
Olympic medalists in equestrian
Sportspeople from Veracruz
Medalists at the 1948 Summer Olympics